Stella Dong is the author of many historical books on China, most notably Shanghai 1842-1949: The Rise and Fall of a Decadent City (Harpers), Peking: Heart of the Celestial Empire (Formasia) and Sun Yat-sen: Enigmatic Revolutionary (Formasia). Born in Seattle, she worked for several magazines before her first book. She is known for her perceptive articles on Chinese-American writers, and has a regular column on American-Asian cultural affairs in Hong Kong's South China Morning Post.  She has also written for the New York Times and Washington Post.

References

External links
 Shanghai The Rise and Fall of a Decadent City

American writers of Chinese descent
Year of birth missing (living people)
Living people